Saleem Sarang (born 1977) is an Indian politician from Maharashtra, affiliated with Nationalist Congress Party. He is the National General Secretary of the Nationalist Congress Party's minority department. Previously he served as the State General Secretary of the ruling Nationalist Congress Party's minority cell in Maharashtra.

Career 
In September 2021, the Nationalist Congress Party (NCP) appointed him as the National General Secretary of the party's minority cell. He also acts as Maharashtra observer for NCP. He previously served as the General Secretary of NCP's minority department of Maharashtra state.

In August 2021, he alleged Navi Mumbai Municipal Corporation (NMMC) for poor cleanliness in the city of Navi Mumbai. In August 2021, Sarang held a press conference to bring the issue of the e-toilets built by NMMC and hoarding scams by advertising agencies and NMMC. He also openly pointed out the loopholes in the functioning of NMMC.

During Covid 19 pandemic and lockdown in Maharashtra, he reached out to the poor and the needy, among whom were many daily wagers and distributed food and ration kits among 10,000 families, reportedly. In August 2021, Sarang was awarded the Mumbai Ratna award by Governor of Maharashtra, Bhagat Singh Koshyari in a ceremony held at Raj Bhavan for his social and philanthropic works.

See also 

 Ajit Pawar
 Jayant Patil
 List of people from Maharashtra

References 

Living people
Nationalist Congress Party politicians
Nationalist Congress Party politicians from Maharashtra
Indian Muslims
People from Navi Mumbai
Politicians from Mumbai
Maharashtra politicians
1977 births